Antpur is a village in the Jangipara community development block of the Srirampore subdivision in the Hooghly District in the Indian state of West Bengal. It is around 20 km from Tarakeswar. Haripal is nearest railway station from Antpur.

History
The most famous temple in Antpur is that of Radhagovindjiu with exquisite terracotta carvings depicting stories from all the 18 puranas. This 100 feet high temple was constructed by Krishna Ram Mitra, the Diwan of Bardhaman Raj in 1786 (1708 Shakabda). Its Chandi Mandap and Dol Mancha have beautifully crafted wood carvings and terracotta.

The period when the temple was built was curious. Muslim rule was ebbing out and the Europeans were making  forays into the country. It is said that Krishna Ram Mitra built the temple to enthuse the Hindus. Terracota work which was earlier an exclusive preserve of Bishnupur artisans was no more so. While Radha and Krishna are predominant in the carvings, there also is the goddess Durga, whose worship had been revived in a big way by Nabakrishna Deb of Shovabazar Rajbari in 1757.

Geography

Location
Antpur is located at 

Villages in Antpur panchayat are as follows: Atpur, Rajhati, Bilara, Lohagachhi, Ranibazar, Anarbati, Arabindapur, Tarajol, Raipur, Bamnagar, Tara, Palgachha, Kumarbazar, Ichhabati, Gopalpur and Mirpur.

Urbanisation
Srirampore subdivision is the most urbanized of the subdivisions in Hooghly district. 73.13% of the population in the subdivision is urban and 26.88% is rural. The subdivision has 6 municipalities and 34 census towns. The municipalities are: Uttarpara Kotrung Municipality, Konnagar Municipality, Serampore Municipality, Baidyabati Municipality, Rishra Municipality and Dankuni Municipality. Amongst the CD Blocks in the subdivision, Uttarapara Serampore (census towns shown in a separate map) had 76% urban population, Chanditala I 42%, Chanditala II 69% and Jangipara 7% (census towns shown in the map above). All places marked in the map are linked in the larger full screen map.

Demographics
As per 2011 Census of India, Antpur had a total population of 2,623 of which 1,363 (52%) were males and 1,260 (48%) were females. Population below 6 years was 211. The total number of literates in Atpur was 1,957 (81.14% of the population over 6 years).

Antpur had a population of 2,548 out of which 944 belonged to scheduled castes and 17 belonged to scheduled tribes.

Economy
Antpur's rural economy has developed due to the presence of the famous temples listed above. There is a constant stream of middle-class devotees who visit Antpur. The villagers are accustomed to vehicular traffic and other exposure to the life-styles of well-off Indians and foreigners.

Rajbalhat, 20 minutes by bus from Antpur, is famous for handloom saris.

Transport
Now, one has to go to Antpur by road either directly from Kolkata or from Tarakeswar or Haripal. From Kolkata via Ahilyabai Holkar Road (State Highway 15) to Gajar More Bus Stop, then from Gajar More left turn, towards Antpur approx 6 km Or From Howrah Station, Tarakeswar/ Arambagh/ Goghat local, to Haripal railway station, from there Buses (9 and 10 - Haripal Station to Udaynarayanpur, 9A - Haripal Station to Bargachia and few Shuttle Buses) are available to Antpur. Earlier Antpur was a station on the Howrah-Amta-Sehakhala-Champadanga narrow-gauge route of the Martin's Light Railways, a private rail service established in 1892. The rail company was shut down in 1971 and the tourist flow to the village declined gradually after that.

Education
Antpur High School is a coeducational higher secondary school. It has arrangements for teaching  Bengali, English, Sanskrit, history, geography, philosophy, political science, economics, eco-geography, accountancy, business economics & mathematics, mathematics, physics, chemistry and bio science.

References

External links

 Satellite view
 Temples of Atpur
 Travel article on Aatpur

Tourist attractions in Hooghly district
Towns & Villages in Jangipara block
Villages in Hooghly district